The 7th Signal Brigade was a military communications brigade of the United States Army subordinate to the 5th Signal Command located in Germany.

By the end of 1965, all USAREUR communications duties, and even the position of USAREUR Deputy Chief of Staff for Communications–Electronics had been transferred to the STRATCOM-Europe sub-command. The Signal transformation trend continued through the 1970s; 7th Signal Brigade was activated in 1970 from assets of the deactivated Seventh Army communications command. STRATCOM-Europe assumed operational control of the brigade in June 1972 and was redesignated as Army Communications Command-Europe (ACC-E) in October 1973.

During the summer of 1974, when ACC-E reorganized as Headquarters, 7th Signal Brigade remained under 5th Signal Command's operational control. In 1981, it was officially assigned to 5th Signal Command. The 7th Signal Brigade comprised the 1st Signal Battalion (Deactivated and cased colors at Kleber Kaserne on 1 April 1993), the 26th Signal Battalion, 44th Signal Battalion and 72nd Signal Battalions.

Since the 1990s, 7th Signal Brigade has maintained a consistently high operational tempo. During Desert Shield and Desert Storm, 5th Signal Command deployed elements of 7th Signal Brigade to the Persian Gulf.

The 268th Signal Company from the 72d Signal Battalion, a subordinate of 7th Signal Brigade also deployed and were attached to VII Corps’ 93rd Signal Brigade. In July 1991, the 7th Signal Brigade supported the humanitarian relief and protection efforts for the Kurds during Operation Provide Comfort.

From January through December 2004, Headquarters, 7th Signal Brigade and 72nd Signal Battalion deployed to Kuwait and Iraq in support of Operation Iraqi Freedom 2, providing tactical communications in support of Combined Forces Land Component Commander in Doha, Kuwait. In March 2005, 7th Signal Brigade deployed Task Force Lightning, comprising elements of 44th and 509th Signal Battalions, to Afghanistan for Operation Enduring Freedom in support of the Southern European Task Force.

On 4 November 2016 it was announced that 5th Signal Command would be decommissioned.

References

External links
 7th Signal Brigade Lineage and Honors

007
Military units and formations established in 1970
Military units and formations disestablished in 2014